The IG Farben Building – also known as the Poelzig Building and the Abrams Building, formerly informally called The Pentagon of Europe – is a building complex in Frankfurt, Germany, which currently serves as the main structure of the West End Campus of the University of Frankfurt. Construction began in 1928 and was complete in 1930 as the corporate headquarters of the IG Farben conglomerate, then the world's largest chemical company and the world's fourth-largest company overall.

The building's original design in the modernist New Objectivity style was the subject of a competition which was eventually won by the architect Hans Poelzig. On its completion, the complex was the largest office building in Europe and remained so until the 1950s. The IG Farben Building's six square wings retain a modern, spare elegance, despite its mammoth size. It is also notable for its paternoster elevators.

The building was the headquarters for production administration of dyes, pharmaceutical drugs, magnesium, lubricating oil, explosives, and methanol, and for research projects relating to the development of synthetic oil and rubber during World War II. Notably IG Farben scientists discovered the first antibiotic, fundamentally reformed medical research and "opened a new era in medicine." After World War II, the IG Farben Building served as the headquarters for the Supreme Allied Command and from 1949 to 1952 the High Commissioner for Germany (HICOG). Notably Dwight D. Eisenhower had his office in the building. It became the principal location for implementing the Marshall Plan, which supported the post-war reconstruction of Europe. The 1948 Frankfurt Documents, which led to the creation of a West German state allied with the western powers, were signed in the building. The IG Farben Building served as the headquarters for the US Army's V Corps and the Northern Area Command (NACOM) until 1995. It was also the headquarters of the CIA in Germany. During the early Cold War, it was referred to by US authorities as the Headquarters Building, United States Army Europe (USAREUR); the US Army renamed the building the General Creighton W. Abrams Building in 1975. It was informally referred to as "The Pentagon of Europe."

In 1995, the US Army transferred the IG Farben Building to the German government, and it was purchased by the state of Hesse on behalf of the University of Frankfurt. Renamed the Poelzig Building in honour of its architect, the building underwent a restoration and was opened as part of the university in 2001. It is the central building of the West End Campus of the university, which also includes over a dozen other buildings built after 2001.

History

The site
The IG Farben Building was developed on land known as the Grüneburggelände. In 1837, the property belonged to the Rothschild family. It was part of the "Affensteiner Feld", an area in the north of today's Frankfurt Westend District. The name Affenstein derives from an ancient Christian memorial that once stood here on the road outside Frankfurt. It was known as the "Avestein" as in Ave Maria but in the local Frankfurt dialect it was called the "Affe Stein". 
In 1864, the city's psychiatric hospital was erected on the site. Here, Dr Heinrich Hoffman hired Alois Alzheimer to work in the hospital, where they both explored progressive methods of treating the mentally ill. The Grüneburgpark was established in 1880 on the larger western part of the site.

Early history
IG Farben acquired the property in 1927 to establish its headquarters there. In the 1920s, IG Farben (full German name Interessengemeinschaft Farbenindustrie Aktiengesellschaft or 'Dye Industry Interest Group Limited') was the world's largest drug, chemical and dye conglomerate. Frankfurt was chosen because of its centrality and its accessibility by air and land.

In August 1928, Professor Hans Poelzig won a limited competition to design the building, among five selected architects, notably beating Ernst May, the then Head of Urban Design for Frankfurt.

Work on the foundations began in late 1928, and in mid-1929 construction started on the steel frame. The building was completed in 1930 after only 24 months, by employing rapid-setting concrete, new construction materials and a round-the-clock workforce. Later in 1930, the Frankfurt director of horticulture Max Bromme and the artists' group Bornimer Kreis developed designs for the 14 hectares of parkland that surrounded the building. The grounds, and the complex as a whole, were completed in 1931 at a total cost of 24 million Reichsmark (equivalent to  million € in ).

1930s and Second World War

After completion, the building was the headquarters of IG Farben for 15 years. IG Farben was an indispensable part of the German industrial base from its establishment in 1925, and the world's largest chemical and pharmaceutical company. Although IG Farben had been reviled on the far right and accused of being an "international capitalist Jewish company", the company nonetheless remained a large government contractor under Nazi Party rule.

During World War II, the surrounding neighbourhood was devastated, but the building itself was left largely intact as it was planned to be used by occupying forces. Until occupied by US forces, the building was inhabited by the homeless citizens of a bomb-ravaged Frankfurt. In March 1945, Allied troops occupied the area and the IG Farben Building became the American headquarters of General Dwight D. Eisenhower. Eisenhower's office was where he received many important guests; including General de Gaulle, Field Marshal Montgomery and Marshal Zhukov. It was there that he signed the "Proclamation No. 2", which determined which parts of the country would be within the American zone. Eisenhower vacated the building in December 1945 but his office was still used for special occasions: the constitution of the state of Hesse was signed there, the West German Ministerpräsident received his commission to compile the Grundgesetz (German constitution) and the administration of the Wirtschaftsrat der Bizone (Economic Council of the Bizone) was also located there.

Cold War

From 1945 to 1947, the IG Farben Building was the location of the Supreme Headquarters, Allied European Forces, and was the headquarters for the US occupation forces and Military Governor. On May 10, 1947, permanent orders to military personnel prohibited further reference to the building as the "IG Farben Building", and instead called for it to be referred to as "The Headquarters Building, European Command". The United States High Commissioner for Germany (HICOG) and his staff occupied the building from 1949 to 1952.

After 1952, the building served as the European centre of the American armed forces and the headquarters of the U.S. V Corps. It later became the headquarters for the Northern Area Command until 1994. The IG Farben Building was also the headquarters of the CIA in Germany, which led to its sobriquet 'the Pentagon of Europe'. On April 16, 1975, the US Army renamed the building the General Creighton W. Abrams Building. The renaming did not have full authority in law, because the US was technically leasing the building from the German government and thus was not the rightful owner.

On May 11, 1972, three bombs were set off by the West German terrorist group Rote Armee Fraktion (Red Army Faction, i.e., the Baader-Meinhof Group). Two bombs went off in a rotunda in the rear entrance of the IG Farben building, and a third exploded in a smaller building behind the IG Farben building that was serving as the US Military's officer's club. Lt. Col. Paul Bloomquist was killed by the last bomb, and dozens of Americans and Germans were injured. The IG Farben building was attacked again by the same group in 1976 and 1982. Consequently, the publicly accessible adjoining park became part of a restricted military zone which also included the military living quarters and work areas at the rear of the building.

Recent years
Following German reunification, the US government announced plans to fully withdraw its troops from Frankfurt by 1995, at which time control of the entire site would be restored to the German Federal Government. It was suggested that the building could become the location for the European Central Bank. In 1996, the state of Hesse bought the building and associated land for the University of Frankfurt. The buildings were refurbished at a cost of 50 Million German Mark (about US$26M or 25M €), by the Copenhagen-based architecture practice Dissing+Weitling and were handed over to the university. The complex now houses the Westend Campus of the university, which includes the departments of Philosophy, History, Theology, Classical Philology, Art and Music, Modern Languages and Linguistics, Cultural and Civilization Studies, the Center for North American Studies and the Fritz-Bauer-Institute.

Renaming controversy
Even in 1995 the association of the building with Nazism had been hard to shake off, despite its outstanding 1920s architecture. Der Spiegel wrote about the "Smell of Guilt" after its public opening in 1995, but also that the building itself did not deserve the bad reputation. Only with the departure of the Americans, the subsequent renovations, and the use of the building by the university has the building's association with Nazi Germany in the popular consciousness receded.

The university's tenancy of the building sparked a debate regarding the name of the building. Former University President Werner Meissner had started the controversy by proposing to name it the "Poelzig-Ensemble" (Poelzig-Complex). Members of the university insisted on confronting the building's history by retaining its original name, the "IG Farben Building".
Meissner's successor, Rudolf Steinberg, upheld the decision to retain the name, but he did not enforce a uniform nomenclature within the university's administration. The university's senate finally settled the discussions in July 2014 by keeping the official name "I.G.-Farbenhaus" (IG Farben Building). 

By 2004 the university set up a permanent exhibition inside the building, and a memorial plaque, for the slave labourers of IG Farben and those who had been murdered with Zyklon B gas, was installed on the front of the building. After 10 years of debate the Senate of the University agreed in 2014 to name a place on the new campus's southern end after the former slave labourer Norbert Wollheim.

Future
Behind the IG Farben Building, the state of Hessen intends to build "Europe's most modern campus" to accommodate the remaining departments of the University's old Bockenheim campus, law, business, social sciences, child development, and the arts. As of 2018, there are several new buildings finished. Construction of the students' union building and of the faculty building for linguistics, cultures, and arts has begun. The last step to complete the new university campus will be the relocation of the main library within the 2020s.

Building

In 1928, IG Farben was the largest chemical company in the world. Consequently, the space requirements for the building were for one of the largest office buildings ever constructed. It was designed in the New Objectivity style.

IG Farben did not want a specifically 'Bauhaus' styled building—it wanted:

A symbol, in iron and stone, of German commercial and scientific manpower. Georg von Schnitzler, IG Farben Director, 1930.
The 250-metre long and 35-metre tall building has nine floors, but the height of the ground floor varies (4.6–4.2 m). This variation is reflected in the roof line which looks taller at the wings than the spine. The volume of the building is 280,000 m3, constructed from 4,600 tonnes of steel frame with brick infill and floors constructed of hollow blocks to provide over 55740 m2 of usable office space". The façade is clad with 33,000 m2 Stuttgart-Bad Cannstatt Travertine marble, punctuated in bands of windows decreasing in height with each storey. Only at the corners are the glazed strips interrupted for emphasis. The top storey is lit from skylights rather than banded glazing and has a very low ceiling height. It forms a clear building conclusion. In the mid-'50s, this upper storey housed a military affiliate radio station (MARS). Until the 1950s, the building was the largest and most modern office building in Europe.

The IG Farben Building consists of six wings, connected by a gently curved, central corridor. This arrangement provides all of the offices with sufficient natural light and ventilation. This design approach for large complexes offers an alternative to the "hollow rectangle" schemes of the time, with their typical inner courtyards. The prototype of this form is the General Motors Building in Detroit (1917–21) by Albert Kahn. The building presents a very large and weighty façade to the front, but this effect is reduced by the concave form.

The main entrance is at the axial centre of the building, comprising a temple-like portico standing in front of the doors—a relatively common motif of administration buildings of the time. The entrance arrangement is regarded by some people as slightly pompous: the entrance and lift doors are of bronze, and the ceiling and walls of the porch are clad in bronze plate and copper friezes. The inner lobby has two curved staircases with a sheet aluminum treatment, and marble walls with a zigzag pattern. The axial centre at the rear of the building has a round glazed façade; here, the view of the buildings at the rear of the site (the "casino") is maximised by the curved walls that afford vistas to the subsidiary buildings 100 m distant, separated from the main building by parkland and a pool. During the American occupation of the building, this rotunda housed a small kiosk; later, it was used as a conference room. Nowadays, it is called the Dwight D. Eisenhower room and accommodates a café.

The paternoster lifts that serve the nine floors are famous, and are popular with the university students. After the recent restoration, the university has pledged to preserve them in perpetuity.

Behind the rotunda is an oblong pool with a Nymphenskulptur (German:Nymph sculpture) at the water's edge created by Fritz Klimsch entitled "Am Wasser". Behind it stands a flat building on a hill with a terrace—the casino of IG Farben and the Officers Club of the US Army ("The Terrace Club"), which now houses a refectory and lecture-rooms.

Rumours
A number of unconfirmed rumours concern the complex:

Hans Poelzig was not favoured by the Nazi regime and was banned by IG Farben from entering the building after its completion.
General Eisenhower issued orders to preserve the building during the bombardment of Frankfurt, because he intended to use it after the war as his headquarters. It may also have been that the building was saved by its proximity to Grüneburgpark with its prisoner of war camp holding captured American airmen.
Two or three basements were under the Poelzig building, which were sealed and flooded. In fact, the building only has one basement level. 
There were rumors about a tunnel connecting the building with Frankfurt's main railway station. In fact there was no tunnel to the station, but a service tunnel to connect the dining facility to the main building's heating system, which was filled up during the 1996–2001 renovation. 
At the reflecting pool behind the building, the "Am Wasser" sculpture of a naked water nymph was moved during the American occupation. The nymph was moved to the Hoechst chemical company in Frankfurt/Hoechst at the request of Mamie Eisenhower (the general's wife), who deemed it inappropriate for a military installation. The statue has since been returned to its original location.

References

Notes

Further reading
Loewy, Peter & Loewy, Hanno. IG Farben House, Gina Kehayoff Verlag, Munich 2001, ISBN
This article incorporates translated material from the German Wikipedia page :de:I.G.-Farben-Haus which references the following books.
Meissner, Werner & Rebentisch, Dieter & Wang, Wilfried (Hrsg.). Der Poelzig-Bau. Vom IG-Farben-Haus zur Goethe-Universität., Fischer Verlag, Frankfurt am Main 1999, 
Walter Mühlhausen: Der Poelzig-Bau in Frankfurt am Main: Von der Schaltzentrale industrieller Macht zum Sitz der amerikanischen Militärregierung. In: Bernd Heidenreich/ Klaus Böhme (Hrsg.): Hessen: Geschichte und Politik. Kohlhammer Verlag, Stuttgart 2000, S. 377–388 (Schriften zur politischen Landeskunde Hessens 5). 
Loewy, Peter & Loewy, Hanno. Das IG Farben-Haus, Kehayoff Verlag, München 2001, 
Von der Grüneburg zum Campus Westend – Die Geschichte des IG Farben-Hauses; Begleitbuch zur Dauerausstellung im IG Farben-Haus, Hrsg. von der Johann Wolfgang Goethe-Universität, Frankfurt am Main 2007, 143 S., zahlr. Ill., .

External links
Fritz Bauer Institute 
University of Frankfurt website
Dissing+Weitling Website
Photographic source 
Photos from 1996 after US withdrawal
3 Further Photos
University of Frankfurt promotional movie

Office buildings completed in 1930
Buildings and structures in Frankfurt
Hans Poelzig buildings
IG Farben
Modernist architecture in Germany
Germany–United States relations